Malkit Singh Keetu was an Indian politician, and a member of Shiromani Akali Dal. He served as member of legislative assembly from Barnala twice (1997, 2002). On 29 October 2012, Keetu was murdered at age of 65 in a family feud.

References 

2012 deaths
Year of birth unknown
Shiromani Akali Dal politicians
Punjab, India MLAs 1997–2002
Punjab, India MLAs 2002–2007
People from Barnala district